Blapsilon is a genus of longhorn beetles of the subfamily Lamiinae, containing the following species:

 Blapsilon austrocaledonicum (Montrouzier, 1861)
 Blapsilon irroratum Pascoe, 1860
 Blapsilon montrouzieri Thomson, 1865
 Blapsilon purpureum Fauvel, 1906
 Blapsilon viridicolle (Chevrolat, 1858)

References

Tmesisternini